4659 Roddenberry, provisional designation , is a Nysian asteroid from the inner regions of the asteroid belt, approximately  in diameter. It was discovered on 2 March 1981, by American astronomer Schelte Bus at the Siding Spring Observatory in Australia. The likely S-type asteroid has an unsecured rotation period of 12 hours. It was named for American screenwriter Gene Roddenberry.

Orbit and classification 

Roddenberry is a core member of the Nysa family, a very large family of stony asteroids, alternatively known as Herta family. It is part of the Nysa–Polana complex, the largest grouping of asteroids in the main-belt. The complex is typically further divided into subfamilies with different spectral properties.

The asteroid orbits the Sun in the inner asteroid belt at a distance of 1.8–2.9 AU once every 3 years and 8 months (1,334 days; semi-major axis of 2.37 AU). Its orbit has an eccentricity of 0.22 and an inclination of 2° with respect to the ecliptic. The body's observation arc begins with a precovery taken at Palomar Observatory in February 1977, or four years prior to its official discovery observation at Siding Spring.

Physical characteristics 

Roddenberry is an assumed stony S-type asteroid, typical for core members of the Nysa family and in agreement with its high albedo (see below).

Rotation period 

In the 1990s, a fragmentary rotational lightcurve of Roddenberry was obtained from photometric observations by Richard Binzel. Lightcurve analysis gave a highly uncertain rotation period of 12 hours with a brightness amplitude of 0.14 magnitude. As of 2018, no secure period has been obtained.

Diameter and albedo 

According to the survey carried out by the NEOWISE mission of NASA's Wide-field Infrared Survey Explorer, Roddenberry measures 3.622 kilometers in diameter and its surface has an albedo of 0.193, while the Collaborative Asteroid Lightcurve Link assumes a standard albedo for stony asteroids of 0.20, and derives a diameter of 3.56 kilometers based on an absolute magnitude of 14.61.

Naming 

This minor planet was named in memory of famous American screenwriter, producer and futurist, Gene Roddenberry (1921–1991), known for the Star Trek and Star Trek: The Next Generation television series, and for the Star Trek film franchise. The official naming citation was published by the Minor Planet Center on 18 February 1992.

References

External links 
 Asteroid Lightcurve Database (LCDB), query form (info )
 Dictionary of Minor Planet Names, Google books
 Asteroids and comets rotation curves, CdR – Observatoire de Genève, Raoul Behrend
 Discovery Circumstances: Numbered Minor Planets (1)-(5000) – Minor Planet Center
 
 

004659
Discoveries by Schelte J. Bus
Named minor planets
19810302